The All-Russia Industrial and Art Exhibitions were a series of 16 exhibitions in the 19th century Russian Empire.

Industrial exhibitions was organised by the law of 1828 under the jurisdiction of the Trade and Manufactory Department of the Ministry of Finance.

Timeline

References

Exhibitions in Russia
Science and technology in Russia
National exhibitions